Janez Gorjanc (born 8 April 1948) is a Slovenian skier. He competed in the Nordic combined event at the 1972 Winter Olympics.

References

External links
 

1948 births
Living people
Slovenian male Nordic combined skiers
Olympic Nordic combined skiers of Yugoslavia
Nordic combined skiers at the 1972 Winter Olympics
Sportspeople from Kranj